Naarda molybdota is a species of moth in the family Noctuidae first described by George Hampson in 1912.

References

Herminiinae
Moths described in 1912